The North Douglas Historic District is a residential section of Douglas, Wyoming, adjoining the original commercial district of Douglas to the north and east. The district grew from about 1904 to about 1912, with a few infills up to the 1940s. About 100 houses are listed as contributing structures.

The North Douglas Historic District was placed on the National Register of Historic Places on November 25, 2002.

References

External links
 North Douglas Historic District at the Wyoming State Historic Preservation Office

		
National Register of Historic Places in Converse County, Wyoming
Queen Anne architecture in Wyoming
Buildings and structures completed in 1886